Rear Admiral Albert Jethro Chegwidden, JAGC, USN (Ret.), is a fictional character played by John M. Jackson. Chegwidden is a main character on the 10-season TV series JAG (recurring character during the first season) spanning from 1996 to 2004, and has made guest appearances on the spinoff series' NCIS season 10 finale, "Damned If You Do" in 2013, and as a recurring character on NCIS: Los Angeles since 2017.

Admiral Chegwidden was the Judge Advocate General of the Navy from around March 1996 until his retirement in May 2004. The "Old Man" may be the Navy's top uniformed lawyer, but he is a hands-on manager, never forgetting his roots as a Navy SEAL during the Vietnam War.

Character Arc

Family and background
The family background of Chegwidden himself has never been revealed (although it might be assumed that Chegwidden, due to the Texan English spoken by actor John M. Jackson, hails from that region as well). At age 24, apparently while stationed in Italy, he married Marcella (played by Barbara Carrera), the daughter of the Mayor of Naples, Italy. In 1972, their daughter, Francesca, was born. Sometime in the 1970s, they divorced and his ex-wife received custody of Francesca. Marcella remarried, to an Italian man named Vittorio Parreti, who was later murdered. Francesca ran into problems when she fell in love with mafia member Luciano Antinori.

Chegwidden had other romances throughout the years with Judge Laura Delaney and Dr. Sydney Walden. Judge Laura Delaney was killed after tripping a landmine on A.J.'s porch, which was placed by an old enemy of his. His last and longest romance in JAG was with Meredith Cavanaugh. They met when she went to JAG headquarters to meet with Lieutenant Colonel Sarah "Mac" MacKenzie, but he thought she was another attempt at matchmaking from his subordinates. He later learned that MacKenzie wanted to speak with Meredith about a course she wanted her "little sister" Chloe to attend and he apologized. Chegwidden and Meredith bonded over their common interest for Shakespeare. Although the Admiral and Meredith got engaged near the end of Season 9, he found out she cheated on him in Season 9 and ended their engagement on the spot.

Lt. Bud Roberts and his wife Harriet Sims named their first son A.J. after him. During episodes where he is stuck at home, he is often kept company by a German shepherd named "Dammit" (the only name the dog would respond to), whom he encountered when he accidentally ejected from an F-14 Tomcat piloted by Commander Harmon "Harm" Rabb Jr. (David James Elliott) into a blizzard-covered forest in Virginia.

Navy career

Chegwidden was a talented pitcher on his high school baseball team. The Cleveland Indians drafted him, but instead he chose to accept an appointment to the United States Naval Academy. After graduating from the Academy, he went on to become a Navy SEAL, and while assigned to SEAL Team 2, Chegwidden served with valor and distinction in the Vietnam War. After the American Withdrawal from Vietnam, Chegwidden, alongside Henrietta Lange (Linda Hunt), Charles Langston (Carl Lumbly), and Sterling Bridges (James Remar), were recruited into a clandestine unit and tasked with retrieving any American operatives with non-official covers from the warzone, including Owen Granger (Miguel Ferrer), requiring them to become "creative as hell" to get the funds necessary to extract them by any means necessary, which culminated in them getting 80 gold bars for ransom money before returning to America in 1978.

When the war ended, he transferred over to surface warfare, and rose to command a Farragut class destroyer; a cased model of one graces the mantel of his JAG office fireplace. Chegwidden is an admirer of Arleigh Burke and a portrait of him also hangs on his JAG office wall. During the 1980s, his career took yet another turn as he left Surface Warfare and went to law school. As a member of the Navy's JAG Corps, he rose quickly through the ranks, serving as the head of the JAG office in the U.S. Pacific Fleet before being appointed Judge Advocate General of the Navy in 1996. Chegwidden succeeded Rear Admiral Al Brovo, USN, played by Kevin Dunn, who only appeared in the pilot episode.

Chegwidden stated in a Maryland court case, while defending Gunnery Sergeant Galindez, that he is a member of the Bar Associations of Virginia, Maryland and New York. Chegwidden retired from the Navy in May 2004.

His successor as Judge Avocate General was Major General Gordon M. Cresswell, USMC, played by David Andrews.

Post-retirement activities
After his retirement from the Navy in 2004, Chegwidden found employment as a senior partner in a Washington DC law firm. He reappeared in the JAG spin-off NCIS as an attorney hired by NCIS Director Leon Vance (Rocky Carroll) to defend Special Agent Leroy Jethro Gibbs (Mark Harmon) during an internal investigation by the DoD Office of the Inspector General and possible trial (which never came about) because Gibbs was temporarily recruited to JSOC to deal with a side investigation into the death of a Navy SEAL by a terrorist group called the "Brotherhood of Doubt."

In February 2017, Chegwidden returned in the NCIS: Los Angeles Season 8 episode "Payback." Chegwidden was summoned to Los Angeles by his old friend, Henrietta Lange, to assist the Office of Special Projects during the final phase of their mole hunt. Once all the moles had been revealed, Hetty asked the Admiral to stay in LA to help her deal with the legal fallout.  In the episode, it is mentioned that at one point he almost tried to kill Assistant Director Owen Granger when Chegwidden was "young" and Granger was "stupid." He also appeared in the episodes "Battle Scars" and "Golden Days," where he, as well as retired Admiral Sterling Bridges, worked with NCIS in a case involving a former war buddy of theirs and Hetty's from a classified mission during the American withdrawal from Vietnam to extract any operatives with non-official covers that had been left behind (including presumably-recently deceased Owen Granger), Charles Langstrom, after he went AWOL. Later, alongside Langstrom, he aided the group with trying to recover 80 gold bars valued at well over $40,000,000 in 2017 currency (and over $1,000,000 in 1978 currency when they returned from Vietnam) from a crooked pawn shop owner named Yaniv, eventually resolving to use it in the remaining days they have left (due to suspected exposure to Agent Orange, just like Owen Granger had been during their mission) to combat criminals and, at the same time, aid any veterans going into VA clinics.

Characterization

Chegwidden often comes across as being hard-nosed and tends to "follow the book". However, he has been known to show vulnerable moments in his life and career, and is fiercely protective of those under his command, whom he considers to be "his people." Not only being the superior of Harmon Rabb Jr. and Sarah MacKenzie, he often instinctively turned into a missing father figure—providing not only comical relief, but also a reflection on their respective personal backgrounds.

When Lt. Bud Roberts was wounded after stepping on a landmine, Chegwidden attempted to soothe the news to Bud's wife, Harriet, and seemed to be a little melodramatic while doing it. Another time he showed his softer side was when he broke the news of Harm's aircraft accident while attempting to return home in time for Mac's engagement party to Mic. When Bud and Harriet had a stillbirth, the Admiral attempted to help both by granting an emergency leave. (Bud, however, refused to stay away longer than a week, feeling that returning to work was in his and his wife's best interests.)

Chegwidden is also known for showing a side of himself that frightens most who have seen it. In one episode, he broke the nose of Special Agent Clayton Webb for putting Harm and Mac in danger. This particular incident impressed Webb so much that he never again tried to ruffle the Admiral's feathers.

He was responsible for the death of Antinori after Antinori had kidnapped Francesca. Even though it was  Francesca who pulled the trigger, the Admiral was present and made no move to stop her. He had earlier killed several of Antinori's bodyguards.

He also scared Harm on several occasions, most notably when Harm and Mic Brumby were responsible for accidentally breaking Bud's jaw in "Boomerang". After being dragged to Australia, Chegwidden yelled at both of them, threatening to horsewhip and keelhaul Harm, until he decided on a non-judicial punishment that fit the crime. He ordered Harm and Mic to confine themselves to a warehouse and did not allow them to come out until each had inflicted the same amount of punishment on the other as they had inflicted on Bud.

He even rattled a CIA "sweeper," when he realized that the rogue agent was playing mind games with him. These mind games resulted in the death of the woman he loved.

The Admiral was targeted by the father of a sailor that the Admiral put away, who later was exonerated. Unfortunately, the young sailor had died in prison. Chegwidden had to show considerable restraint to keep himself from killing the man.

On more than one occasion Chegwidden put his career on the line to back his staff or to help them when they needed it. According to Harriet Sims, the Admiral went to his boss, the Secretary of the Navy, pleading in letter, citing legal precedent, why Bud Roberts should not be passed over for promotion (Roberts was no longer qualified for sea duty after losing a leg to a land mine while rescuing an Afghani boy who had wandered into a minefield). The usual result of being passed over for promotion three times is involuntary separation from the Navy (in Bud's case, forced retirement on medical grounds). Bud's promotion to Lieutenant Commander was duly made and administering the oath of office was what Chegwidden  considered to be his last official act as Judge Advocate General.

Awards and decorations

Admiral Chegwidden would also be authorized to wear the Surface Warfare Officer badge based on his statements that he commanded a destroyer following his Vietnam service.

Conceptual history

JAG creator Donald P. Bellisario named this character's first names after those of his own father, Albert Jethro Bellisario.

References

JAG (TV series) characters
NCIS (TV series) characters
NCIS: Los Angeles characters
Fictional admirals
Television characters introduced in 1996
Fictional Gulf War veterans
Fictional American lawyers
Fictional Judge Advocate General's Corps (United States) personnel
Fictional United States Navy SEALs personnel
Fictional Vietnam War veterans
Crossover characters in television